Hougham Without is a civil parish between Dover and Folkestone in southeast England. The main settlements are the villages of Church Hougham and West Hougham, collectively known simply as "Hougham". Great Hougham Court Farm is located to the south of the two villages, near the Dover transmitting station. The Channel Tunnel runs underground just south of West Hougham and directly under both Church Hougham and the Farm.

See also
 Hougham Battery
 Lydden Spout Battery
 St. Radegund's Abbey
 Samphire Hoe
 Alkham Valley

References

External links
 Hougham church illustrations

Villages in Kent
Dover District
Civil parishes in Kent